Phineas Jones (April 18, 1819, Spencer, Massachusetts – April 19, 1884, Newark, New Jersey) was an American businessman and Republican politician who represented New Jersey's 6th congressional district in the United States House of Representatives for one term from 1881 to 1883.

Early career
Jones was born in Spencer, Massachusetts on April 18, 1819 to Phineas Jones, a soldier in the American Revolutionary War, and Hannah Phillips, a descendant of Rev. George Phillips who settled Watertown, Massachusetts in 1630.

He attended the common schools in Spencer and moved to Elizabeth, New Jersey (then called Elizabethtown) in 1855, where he was a member of the city council of Elizabeth from 1856-1860. He moved to Newark in 1860 and engaged in manufacturing and mercantile pursuits.

He was vice president of the New Jersey State Agricultural Society, and served as a member of the New Jersey General Assembly in 1873 and 1874.

Congress
Jones was elected as a Republican to the Forty-seventh Congress, serving in office from March 4, 1881 - March 3, 1883, but declined to be a candidate for renomination in 1882.

Later life
After leaving Congress, Jones retired from active life and died in Newark on April 19, 1884, the day after his 65th birthday. He was interred in Evergreen Cemetery in Hillside, New Jersey.

References

External links

Phineas Jones at The Political Graveyard

1819 births
1884 deaths
People from Spencer, Massachusetts
American people of Welsh descent
Republican Party members of the New Jersey General Assembly
Politicians from Elizabeth, New Jersey
Politicians from Newark, New Jersey
Republican Party members of the United States House of Representatives from New Jersey
Burials at Evergreen Cemetery (Hillside, New Jersey)
19th-century American politicians
Businesspeople from Elizabeth, New Jersey
Businesspeople from Newark, New Jersey
Phillips family (New England)